Kraghave is a village in western Falster, Denmark. It belongs to Guldborgsund Municipality, in Region Zealand. It is located just to the north of Nykøbing Falster, along European route E55. It is bordered by Bangsebro just to the southeast and Stubberup to the north.

References

Villages in Denmark
Guldborgsund Municipality
Falster